Don Matthews (23 September 1936 – 12 September 2015) was an  Australian rules footballer who played with South Melbourne in the Victorian Football League (VFL).

Notes

External links 

1936 births
2015 deaths
Australian rules footballers from Victoria (Australia)
Sydney Swans players